Cheshmeh-ye Mirza Hoseyn (also Romanized as Cheshmeh-ye Mīrzā Ḩoseyn) is a village in Kuhdasht-e Jonubi Rural District, in the Central District of Kuhdasht County, Lorestan Province, Iran. At the 2006 census, its population was 99, in 19 families.

References 

Towns and villages in Kuhdasht County